Acacia hastulata is a shrub belonging to the genus Acacia and the subgenus Phyllodineae that is endemic to an area in south western Australia.

Description
Like most species of Acacia it has phyllodes rather than true leaves. The crowded, patent and evergreen phyllodes have a narrow triangular shape resembling a spearhead and taper to a sharp point. They are glabrous and rigid and have a prominent central midrib. It produces cream-yellow flowers from July to November. The spherical flower-heads contain three to five creamy yellow coloured flowers. Following flowering red-brown striated seed pods form.

Taxonomy
The species was first formally described by the botanist James Edward Smith in 1818 as part of the Abraham Rees work The Cyclopaedia. It was reclassified as Racosperma hastulatum by Leslie Pedley in 2003 then transferred back to genus Acacia in 2014. It belongs to the Acacia horridula group but is easily distinguished by the shape of the its phyllodes. The type specimen was collected from around King George Sound by Archibald Menzies as part of the Vancouver Expedition.

Distribution
It is native to an area along the south coast in the Goldfields-Esperance, Great Southern and South West regions of Western Australia where it is commonly situated along watercourses and swampy areas. The bulk of the population is found from south of Nannup and the Scott River in the west to around Albany in the east with an isolated population found much further east around Esperance where it is found in forests that also usually contain species of Melaleuca or Banksia and is also located within karri forest communities.

See also
 List of Acacia species

References

hastulata
Acacias of Western Australia
Taxa named by James Edward Smith
Plants described in 1818